Anup Sridhar (born 11 April 1983) is a retired Indian badminton player.

Career
Anup Sridhar is India's Thomas Cup captain. He completed his education from Jain University, Bangalore. Anup's best year on tour so far was 2007 during which he ended the year as the top Indian badminton player with a ranking of 25. His highest world ranking of 24 was achieved in early 2008. National Champion 2005, and 2006. India #1 2005, 2006, 2007 and 2008. 

Having reached the semifinals at the German Open and the Asian Badminton Championships and the quarterfinals at the Thailand Open and, most importantly, at the 2007 World Championships, the next year holds much promise for this budding shuttler. 

His most famous win was the one over Taufik Hidayat – former world no. 1, gold medalist at the 2004 Athens Olympics and 2005 World Champion – at the World Championships in what was one of the longest matches of the tournament.  Anup's performance at the World Championships was rated among the top-10 Indian sporting performances of 2007.

Anup started 2008 by winning the prestigious Pramod Mahajan All-India ranking tournament in New Delhi.  He followed that up by reaching the pre-quarterfinals, one round better than last year, of the Proton Malaysia Super Series where he lost to Hyun Il Lee, the eventual runner-up.

He contested in the men's singles event at the 2008 Summer Olympics in Beijing. He defeated Marco Vasconcelos of Portugal in the round of 64 by 21-16, 21-14. But in round of 16, he lost to Shoji Sato of Japan by 13-21, 17-21.

Anup won his 4th career title at the 2013 Yonex Czech International tournament, beating Indra Bagus Ade Chandra of Italy 21-11 21-16 in 30 minutes.

Vodafone Indian Badminton League
Anup Sridhar represented Pune Pistons at the inaugural Vodafone Indian Badminton League in 2013, with salary of USD 6,000 dollars. He won his only match played in the entire season against Hu Yun, ranked 8th in the world who represented Banga Beats, 21-12 21-18. With the win, he was the Vodafone Player of the Tie.

Achievements

Asian Championships

BWF International 

  BWF International Challenge tournament
  BWF International Series tournament
  BWF Future Series tournament

See also
 Indian Squad for 2008 Olympics

References

External links
 
 Anup's homepage
 Anup Sridhar's Blog

1983 births
Living people
Indian male badminton players
Olympic badminton players of India
Badminton players at the 2008 Summer Olympics
Badminton players at the 2006 Asian Games
Commonwealth Games bronze medallists for India
Commonwealth Games medallists in badminton
Badminton players at the 2006 Commonwealth Games
Racket sportspeople from Bangalore
Recipients of the Arjuna Award
Kannada people
Indian national badminton champions
Asian Games competitors for India
Medallists at the 2006 Commonwealth Games